Elizabeth Andrews OBE (1882–1960) was the first woman organiser of the Labour Party in Wales.

Andrews, née Smith, was born into a mining family at Hirwaun in the Cynon Valley, one of eleven children (two of whom died during childhood). She lived in Station Road, Hirwaun, and was obliged to leave school at the age of twelve, in order to help at home. Ten years later, a letter she wrote to the press in support of Evan Roberts gained her some attention, and she joined the women's suffrage movement at about the same time. She was one of three women who gave evidence before the Sankey Commission in 1918, speaking before the House of Lords, along with two miners' wives.

As soon as women received the vote, the Labour Party appointed four female organisers, of whom Andrews was one. She campaigned tirelessly for health and education services. One of her great successes was the opening of the first nursery school in Wales in the Rhondda in 1938.  
She was awarded the OBE in 1948 for her services as a JP in Ystrad Rhondda.

In 2004, she came 100th in the on-line poll to find 100 Welsh Heroes with a total of 37 votes. In 2006 her book A Woman's Work is Never Done, originally printed in 1952, was reprinted following a revival in her work by Glenys Kinnock. Andrews was one of five women shortlisted in 2018 for the first statue of a woman to be erected in Cardiff.

Works

References

External links
100 Welsh Heroes

1882 births
1960 deaths
19th-century Welsh people
20th-century Welsh politicians
20th-century Welsh writers
19th-century Welsh women
20th-century Welsh women politicians
20th-century Welsh women writers
People from Hirwaun
Welsh Labour politicians
Welsh suffragists
Officers of the Order of the British Empire
Edwardian era